Lynda Bennett (born 1954) is a New Zealand lawn bowler. She won the silver medal, along with teammates Barry Wynks and Mark Noble, in the Open para-sport triples event at the 2014 Commonwealth Games.

References

1954 births
Living people
New Zealand female bowls players
Bowls players at the 2014 Commonwealth Games
Commonwealth Games medallists in lawn bowls
Commonwealth Games silver medallists for New Zealand
20th-century New Zealand women
21st-century New Zealand women
Medallists at the 2014 Commonwealth Games